Creative Power Entertaining Co., Ltd. (CPE) is a Chinese animation company. Its former headquarters was in the Wuzi Block in Yuexiu District, Guangzhou. Currently, its headquarters is located in the Creative Park at 20 Taihegang Road in the Yuexiu District of Guangzhou.
In 2004 CPE released its first cartoon series: "Happy Family". Since 2005 until now, it has produced over 2,500 episodes of "Pleasant Goat and Big Big Wolf", a popular Chinese animated series. CPE's main agent was the Walt Disney Company, and in 2010 it had over 300 agents to sell its products. The company's profit margins "broke even" when Pleasant Goat became a success. In October 2010 the CPE entered in a licensing agreement with Buena Vista to air CPE cartoons in 52 countries and territories in the Asia Pacific region.

List of Pleasant Goat and Big Big Wolf series

Television Animations 
 Pleasant Goat and Big Big Wolf
Pleasant Goat and Big Big Wolf - Pleasant Goat Sports Game
Pleasant Goat and Big Big Wolf - Joys Of Seasons
Pleasant Goat and Big Big Wolf - Smart Dodging
Pleasant Goat and Big Big Wolf - Happy, Happy, Bang! Bang!
Pleasant Goat and Big Big Wolf - The Athletic Carousel
Pleasant Goat and Big Big Wolf - The Happy Diary
Pleasant Goat and Big Big Wolf - Happy Formula
Pleasant Goat and Big Big Wolf - Paddi the Amazing Chef
Pleasant Goat and Big Big Wolf - Dear Little Wish
Pleasant Goat and Big Big Wolf - The Tailor's Closet
Pleasant Goat and Big Big Wolf - Love You Babe
Pleasant Goat and Big Big Wolf - Adventures in the Primitive World
Pleasant Goat and Big Big Wolf - Marching to the New Wonderland
Pleasant Goat and Big Big Wolf - The Little Detective
Pleasant Goat and Big Big Wolf - Adventures in the Sea
Pleasant Goat and Big Big Wolf - War of Invention
Pleasant Goat and Big Big Wolf - Flying Island: The Sky Adventure
Pleasant Goat and Big Big Wolf - Mighty Little Defenders
Pleasant Goat and Big Big Wolf - Rescue Across Time  
Pleasant Goat and Big Big Wolf - The Intriguing Alien Guest  
Pleasant Goat and Big Big Wolf - Against the Dark Force  
Pleasant Goat and Big Big Wolf - Dunk for Victories(喜羊羊与灰太狼之筐出胜利)
Pleasant Goat and Big Big Wolf - Ultimate Battle: The Next Generation(喜羊羊与灰太狼之决战次时代)
Pleasant Goat and Big Big Wolf - The Great Rescue(喜羊羊与灰太狼之奇妙大营救)
 
 Happy Family - Family of Joy
 Cookie Master 
 Planet of 7 Colors
 Legendary Soccer Kid

Web Animations 
 Pleasant Goat and Big Big Wolf series
Pleasant Goat and Big Big Wolf - Around the World in 20 Days
Pleasant Goat and Big Big Wolf - Everyday Pleasant Goat
Pleasant Goat and Big Big Wolf - Man Jing Tou
Pleasant Goat Fun Class subseries
Pleasant Goat Fun Class: Animals & Plants
Pleasant Goat Fun Class: Sports are Fun
Pleasant Goat Fun Class: The Earth Carnival
Pleasant Goat Fun Class: Travel Around the World
Pleasant Goat Fun Class: Idiom World
Pleasant Goat Fun Class: Finding Treasures
Mighty Goat Squad
Mighty Goat Squad 2
Mr.Wolffy, Mr.Right!
 Fun Alliance

Animated films
Pleasant Goat and Big Big Wolf series
Pleasant Goat and Big Big Wolf - The Super Adventure
Pleasant Goat and Big Big Wolf – Desert Trek: The Adventure of the Lost Totem
Pleasant Goat and Big Big Wolf – Moon Castle: The Space Adventure
Pleasant Goat and Big Big Wolf – Mission Incredible: Adventures on the Dragon's Trail
Pleasant Goat and Big Big Wolf – The Mythical Ark: Adventures in Love & Happiness
Pleasant Goat and Big Big Wolf – Meet the Pegasus (喜羊羊与灰太狼之飞马奇遇记)
Pleasant Goat and Big Big Wolf – Amazing Pleasant Goat (喜羊羊与灰太狼之羊年喜羊羊)
Pleasant Goat and Big Big Wolf - Dunk for Future (喜羊羊与灰太狼大电影：筐出未来)
Happy Family series
Happy Family - Snowball the Memory Gobbler (宝贝女儿好妈妈之吃记忆的大雪球)

Live-action animated films
Pleasant Goat and Big Big Wolf series
Pleasant Goat and Big Big Wolf - I Love Wolffy (喜羊羊与灰太狼之我爱灰太狼)
Pleasant Goat and Big Big Wolf - I Love Wolffy 2 (喜羊羊与灰太狼之我爱灰太狼2)

Law case
In Lianyungang, Jiangsu province, boys tied their friends up the branch, and under it is the fire, like the wolf in the Pleasant Goat and Big Big Wolf. In December 2013, a local court in China's Jiangsu province held the producers of the show partially liable for injuries caused to two five-year-old boys as they were imitating scenes from the show, and ordered them to pay 15% of their medical bills (39 thousand RMB). The verdict sparked debate about the effects of watching cartoon violence on Chinese television.

Footnotes

References

External links
 Creative Power Entertaining 
 Creative Power Entertaining 
 Creative Power Entertaining (Archive)
 Creative Power Entertaining Cartoons (Archive)

Companies based in Guangzhou
Chinese animation studios
Yuexiu District